GPT-J is an open source artificial intelligence language model developed by EleutherAI. GPT-J performs very similarly to OpenAI's GPT-3 on various zero-shot down-streaming tasks and can even outperform it on code generation tasks. The newest version, GPT-J-6B is a language model based on a data set called The Pile. The Pile is an open-source 825 gigibyte language modelling data set that is split into 22 smaller datasets. GPT-J is similar to ChatGPT in ability, although it does not function as a chat bot, only as a text predictor.

References 

Large language models